İzzet Günay (born 21 August 1934) is Turkish film and stage actor. He is one of the most experienced and well-known Turkish actors with appearances in more than 100 films across six decades.

Biography
Günay studied at Haydarpaşa High School and Deniz High School. He worked at the İstanbul Municipal Public Works department and then in the lignite business.

Günay answered a casting call in a newspaper and ended up being cast in Haldun Dormen's play Kara Ağaçlar Altında. He then appeared in several other plays such as Sokak Kızı İrma, and Pasifik Şarkısı Zafer Madalyası.

In 1959, Günay made his film debut in the Kemal Film production Kırık Plak as Zeki Müren's driver. After a number of small roles, he landed the main role in Varan Bir. For a short time, he had a musical career in classical music. He won the Best Actor award at the Antalya Golden Orange Festival for his role in Ağaçlar Ayakta Ölür in 1964.

Filmography

Aşka Sürgün - 2005 
Yadigar - 2004 
Bay E - 1995 
Unutulmayanlar - 1981 
Renkli Dünya - 1980 
Güngörmüşler - 1976 
Duyun Beni - 1975 
Kısmet - 1974 
Felek - 1973 
Çapkınlar Şahı / Don Juan 72  1972 
Kader Yolcuları - 1972 
Aşk Ve Cinayet Meleği - 1972 
Aşkım Kaderim Oldu - 1972 
Kefenin Cebi Yok Fırtına - 1972 
O Ağacın Altında - 1972 
Suya Düşen Hayal - 1972 
Hedefte Beş Adam - 1972 
Kaderin Esiriyiz - 1972 
Hayat Mı Bu - 1972 
Anneler Ve Kızları - 1971 
İki Belalı Adam - 1971 
Katil Kim - 1971 
Silahlar Konuşuyor - 1971 
Yarın Ağlayacağım - 1971 
Kezban Paris'te - 1971 
Ali Cengiz Oyunu - 1971 
Genç Kızlar Pansiyonu - 1971 
Gizli Aşk - 1971 
Katiller - 1971 
Bebek Gibi Maşallah - 1971 
Birleşen Yollar - 1970 
Kara Dutum - 1970 
Red Kit - 1970 
Duyduk Duymadık Demeyin - 1970 
Şıllık - 1970 
Günahsız Katiller - 1970 
Kanunsuz Kardeşler - 1970 
Şoför Nebahat - 1970 
Aşk Yarışı - 1969 
Esmerin Tadı Sarışının Adı - 1969 
Seninle Ölmek İstiyorum - 1969 
Şahane İntikam - 1969 
Asi Kabadayı - 1969 
Cesur Kabadayı - 1969 
Garibanlar Mahallesi - 1969 
Kadın Paylaşılmaz - 1969 
Tatlı Günler - 1969 
Fakir Kızı Leyla - 1969 
İncili Çavuş - 1968 
Affedilmeyen Suç - 1968 
Menderes Köprüsü - 1968 
Kara Atmaca'nın İntikamı - 1968 
Atlı Karınca Dönüyor - 1968 
Kezban - 1968 
Vesikalı Yarim - 1968 
Arkadaşımın Aşkısın (Kan Kardeşim) - 1968 
Kader Böyle İstedi - 1968 
Kalbimdeki Yabancı - 1968 
Dolmuş Şoförü - 1967 
Ağlayan Kadın - 1967 
Düşman Aşıklar - 1967 
Hayat Acıları - 1967 
Hırçın Kadın - 1967 
Kederli Günlerim - 1967 
Sefiller - 1967 
Kara Kartal (1) - 1967 
Zalimler De Sever - 1967 
Kara Atmaca - 1967 
Ayrılık Saati - 1967 
Kardeş Kavgası - 1967 
Kanlı Mezar - 1966 
Namus Kanla Yazılır - 1966 
Yumrukların Kanunu - 1966 
Ailenin Yüz Karası - 1966 
Tehlikeli Oyun - 1966 
Çeşmemeydanlı Ali - 1966 
Fakir Ve Mağrur - 1966 
Şeref Kavgası - 1966 
Akşam Güneşi - 1966 
Ümit Sokağı - 1966 
Ay Yıldız Fedaileri - 1966 
Beyoğlu Esrarı - 1966 
Kumarbaz - 1965 
Yabancı Olduk Şimdi - 1965 
Cici Kızlar - 1965 
Gurbet Türküsü - 1965 
Kolla Kendini Bebek - 1965 
Sevdalı Kabadayı - 1965 
Yalancı - 1965 
Nazar Değmez İnşallah - 1965 
Şeker Hafiye - 1965 
Eller Yukarı - 1965 
Severek Ölenler (Kartalların Öcü) - 1965 
Elveda Sevgilim - 1965 
Ekmekçi Kadın - 1965 
Tığ Gibi Delikanlı - 1964 
Fıstık Gibi Maşallah - 1964 
Macera Kadını - 1964 
Öpüşmek Yasak - 1964 
Anasının Kuzusu - 1964 
Anadolu Çocuğu - 1964 
Asfalt Rıza - 1964 
Aslan Marka Nihat (Aşk Otobüsü) - 1964 
Bomba Gibi Kız - 1964 
Ölümün Ücreti - 1964 
Kimse Fatma Gibi Öpemez - 1964 
Varan Bir - 1964 
Kavga Var - 1964 
Yiğitler Yatağı - 1964 
Tophaneli Osman - 1964 
Acemi Çapkın - 1964 
Ağaçlar Ayakta Ölür - 1964 
Afilli Delikanlılar - 1964 
Çalınan Aşk - 1963 
Hop Dedik - 1963 
Beni Osman Öldürdü - 1963 
Tatlı Sert - 1963 
Barut Fıçısı - 1963 
Çifte Nikah - 1962 
Fatoş'un Bebekleri - 1962 
Kırık Plak - 1959

References

External links 
 

1934 births
Living people
People from Üsküdar
Turkish male film actors
Turkish male stage actors
Golden Orange Life Achievement Award winners